The Emirates fleet is composed of two wide-bodied aircraft families, the Airbus A380 and Boeing 777. The airline also has the Airbus A350-900, Boeing 777X and Boeing 787-9 aircraft on order.

Current fleet

As of September 2022, the Emirates mainline fleet consists of the following widebody aircraft:

Emirates Executive aircraft

As of September 2022, the Emirates Executive fleet consists of the following aircraft:

Historical fleet

Emirates was conceived in March 1985 with backing from Dubai's royal family, whose Dubai Air Wing provided two of the airline's first aircraft, used Boeing 727-200/Advs. It also leased a new Boeing 737-300 as well as an Airbus A300B4-200, both from Pakistan International Airlines, Emirates then launched daily nonstop service to London Gatwick on 6 July 1987 with two new Airbus A310s. By 1994 the airline had a fleet of 18 Airbus aircraft. Seven new Boeing 777s worth over US$1 billion were ordered in 1992, which began to arrive in summer 1996.

Emirates' Airbus A300B4-200 fleet was retired from service by the end of 1987. Emirates' Airbus A300-600Rs were retired in 2002 and replaced by Airbus A330-200s. The Boeing 727-200/Advs remained in service with the airline for nine years, and were sold in 1995. The Boeing 737-300 remained in service for two years from 1985 to 1987. The last pax Airbus A310-300 was retired after operating its final flight on 29 July 2007 from Alexandria, Egypt to Dubai, UAE and was sold to Qatar Amiri Flight in 2008. Emirates SkyCargo Airbus A310s were retired in 2009. The planned phaseout of Emirates' older large Airbus widebodies started in February 2011, starting with the retirement of two Airbus A330-200s from its fleet. The last Airbus A340-500 was withdrawn from service on 31 March 2016 after operating a final flight from Kabul to Dubai.

The first Boeing 777-300ER was withdrawn from use on 27 March 2017 after performing its final flight for Emirates as Flight 724 from Addis Ababa.

In December 2017, Emirates retired the last of the Emirates SkyCargo Boeing 747-400 Freighters.

Emirates started retiring 777-300 from its fleet in 2016, retiring its last 777-300 on 26 September 2019.

On 29 and 30 October 2016, Emirates retired three aircraft types from its operating fleet, namely the Airbus A330-200, A340-300 and Boeing 777-200ER. This simplification of aircraft reduced the airline's current fleet to just two aircraft families for passenger service until the addition of the Airbus A350-900 in 2023: the Airbus A380-800 and three models from the Boeing 777 family.

Emirates has operated the following aircraft since 1985:

Fleet development

Order history
The airline made history at the Paris Air Show in June 2003 when it announced the biggest order ever in civil aviation at that time. The order comprised 71 aircraft list-priced at a combined US$19 billion and included firm purchase orders for 21 Airbus A380-800s and leasing orders for two A380-800s. Emirates also announced operating lease orders for 26 Boeing 777-300ERs. On 16 November 2003, Emirates ordered 41 Airbus aircraft, comprising two A340-500s, 18 A340-600s and 21 A380-800s.

On 20 November 2005, Emirates announced firm orders for 42 Boeing 777 aircraft, in a deal worth Dhs 35.7 billion (US$9.7 billion) at list prices. This was the largest-ever order for the Boeing 777 family of aircraft and consisted of 24 Boeing 777-300ERs, 10 Boeing 777-200LR Worldliners and eight Boeing 777F cargo aircraft, with the first aircraft scheduled for delivery in 2007. In addition, Emirates took purchase rights for 20 more 777 aircraft.

During the Farnborough Air Show in July 2006, Emirates signed a Heads of Agreement for ten Boeing 747-8F aircraft, in a deal worth US$3.3 billion. On 31 October 2006, Emirates cancelled an order for 20 Airbus A340-600 aircraft, ending a delay in the delivery of the aircraft pending enhancements.

On 7 May 2007, Emirates reaffirmed its order for 43 A380-800s and committed to another four which brought its order to 47. On 18 June 2007, during the Paris Air Show, Emirates ordered eight additional A380-800s, bringing its total ordered to 55.

Emirates, which was deciding between the Boeing 787 Dreamliner and Airbus A350, also stated it would decide on an order worth as much as US$20 billion for mid-sized aircraft by October 2007, and that the design of the Airbus A350 was closing in on Boeing's 787 Dreamliner. On 11 November 2007, during the Dubai Airshow, Emirates ordered 70 Airbus A350 XWBs, with the first delivery set for 2014. A firm $16.1bn order for 50 A350-900s and 20 A350-1000s was made with an option for 50 more aircraft, at an additional cost of $11.5bn; the airline planned to use the A350s on its European, African and Asian routes. On the same day Emirates also ordered nine Airbus A380-800s, bringing its total orders for the type to 58 aircraft. The airline also ordered 12 Boeing 777-300ERs. In total the deals were worth an estimated $34.9bn at list prices.

On 28 July 2008, Emirates signed a letter of intent for 60 Airbus aircraft: 30 Airbus A350s plus 30 A330-300s. The agreement was signed between Sheikh Ahmed Bin Saeed Al Maktoum, chairman and chief executive of Emirates and Group and Tom Enders, Airbus president and CEO on the occasion of the airline's first A380-800 delivery in Hamburg, Germany. However, in June 2010 the airline confirmed it had decided not to proceed with the order for 30 A330-300s and 30 A350-1000s announced in July 2008; and was in talks with Boeing for a smaller wide-body aircraft.

The airline converted an order for A380Fs that were due for delivery in 2009 into the passenger version. In place of the A380Fs the airline ordered ten Boeing 747-8 freighters for its SkyCargo subsidiary. Emirates chose the Boeing 747-8 "derivative" freighter over the all-new Airbus A380F for its nose-loading capability, something the rival Airbus freighter would have lacked.

On 8 June 2010, at the Berlin Air show, Emirates ordered an additional 32 A380s worth $11.5 billion; this brought the total ordered by the airline to 90. Emirates expected all 90 superjumbos to be delivered by 2017. None of the additional 32 jets were to replace existing A380s; although Emirates received its first A380 in 2008 it did not expect to retire these early airframes before 2020. Later in June 2010, Tim Clark, the president of Emirates, hinted at further orders for A380s.

On 19 July 2010, at the Farnborough Air Show in the UK, Emirates ordered 30 Boeing 777-300ERs worth $9.1 billion.

On 17 November 2013, Emirates announced at a press conference at the Dubai Airshow that it was placing an order for an additional 50 Airbus A380-800s, bringing the overall order total to 140.

On 11 June 2014, Emirates and Airbus announced that Emirates had opted to cancel its orders for 70 A350 XWBs.

Airbus A380

On 28 July 2008, Emirates received its first Airbus A380-800, and in August 2008 it became the second airline to fly the A380-800, after Singapore Airlines. The airline currently uses its A380-800s for service to over 40 destinations.

Emirates is the largest operator of the A380. Its 100th A380 was delivered in October 2017. Furthermore, the airline had 41 more A380s on order, which would have increased the number of A380s in service to 142. It considered buying an additional 100 to 200 Airbus A380s if the four-engined superjumbo had been revamped with more fuel-efficient engines by 2020.

Emirates' A380s were originally all powered by Engine Alliance GP7200 engines. In a deal worth US$9.2 billion, Rolls-Royce announced in April 2015 that it would supply engines for 50 new Airbus A380s (termed A380CEO), with first delivery due in mid-2016. On 29 December 2016, the first Emirates Rolls-Royce-powered A380 landed at Dubai airport.

On 18 January 2018, Emirates signed a memorandum of understanding to acquire additional Airbus A380 aircraft. The commitment was for 20 A380s, with an option for 16 more; deliveries were to start in 2020. The aircraft were valued at US$16 billion.

In February 2019, following a review of its operations, Emirates cancelled most of the A380s it had on order, bringing to 14 the number of Airbus A380s remaining to be delivered to the airline. The first A380 delivered to the airline was one of twelve aircraft delivered on 12-year leases, resulting in the A380 fleet being retired from service from July 2020 onwards, with the last scheduled to be delivered the following year. Given the lack of orders from other airlines, Airbus will cease production of the A380 the same year.

As of September 2019, Emirates initiated its A380 retirement planwhich will see the type remain in service until at least 2035by retiring two aircraft that were due for a major overhaul, and using them as parts donors for the rest of the fleet. As further aircraft are retired, Emirates-owned airframes will continue to be used for parts, while leased airframes will be returned to the lessors.

On 23 February 2020, Emirates retired its first Airbus A380 (registration A6-EDB) after nearly 12 years of service.

Boeing 777 and 777X
Emirates has the world's largest fleet of Boeing 777s, and plans to start phasing out older first generation "classic" 777s (777-200ER, 777-300) in favour of new 777Xs. In October 2014, Emirates retired its first Boeing 777 after 18 years of service, and the same month took delivery of its 100th Boeing 777-300ER. Emirates retired one 777-300ER in 2017, followed by two more as of May 2018. Emirates received its last 777-300ER on 13 December 2018. Deliveries of the  777X will start in 2024, with 115 aircraft on order.

Boeing 787, Airbus A350 XWB and Airbus A330neo
Emirates Chairman and CEO, Sheikh Ahmed bin Saeed Al Maktoum said the carrier would decide between the Airbus A350 XWB and Boeing 787 Dreamliner as to which type to order by the end of 2017.
At the start of the November 2017 Dubai Air Show, Emirates announced a commitment for forty Boeing 787-10s worth a total of US$15.1 billion at list prices.
As Boeing had 171 orders for the variant, these would be delivered from 2018 in two- and three-class cabins for 240 to 300 passengers, with conversion rights to the smaller 787-9. However, by early 2019 it was considering cancelling this order because engine performance margins were insufficient for the prevailing hot weather conditions in Dubai, in favour of the A350.

In February 2019, almost five years after cancelling orders for 70 Airbus A350s in favour of ordering more A380s, Emirates decided to order Airbus' newest generation widebody aircraft, namely the Airbus A330neo and Airbus A350-900; and reduce its orders for the Airbus A380. The memorandum of understanding was for 40 A330-900 aircraft and 30 A350-900s, worth US$21.4 billion at list prices. The order for 40 Boeing 787s announced in 2017 had not been formalised by the time of the order for the A330neos and A350s, and although Emirates' 2018-2019 results dropped all mention of the 787, the airline subsequently confirmed that discussions regarding the 787 were ongoing. During the 2019 Dubai Airshow, a firm order for 50 A350-900s was announced replacing the earlier memorandum of understanding. The deal is worth US$16 billion at list prices with deliveries set to start in 2023. Emirates also announced a firm order for 30 Boeing 787-9s for US$8.8 billion at list prices with deliveries expected to start in 2023. With this deal however, Emirates reduced its Boeing 777X order to 126 aircraft from the previous deal of 150 aircraft. Emirates also cancelled its Airbus A330-900 orders placed in February 2019 in favor of the new aircraft order for 30 Boeing 787-9 Dreamliners.

On November 26, 2019, Emirates, the host carrier of the 2019 Dubai Air Show made two order announcements for both the Airbus A350 and the Boeing 787. In the aftermath of this announcement, some have claimed that the A330neo order has been cancelled, however, Emirates has confirmed this is not the case.

References

External links

Official website
Emirates - Company profile
The Emirates Group
Emirates Media Centre

Fleet
Lists of aircraft by operator